Old Kildonan is the northernmost city ward of Winnipeg, Manitoba. Before the City of Winnipeg Act of 1972, it was an independent unincorporated municipality called the Municipality of Old Kildonan; prior to that, from 1914, it was a subdivision of the Rural Municipality of Kildonan.

It is bounded by the north limit of the City of Winnipeg on the north; by the CP Winnipeg Beach railway, slightly past McPhillips Street, on the east; Brookside Boulevard (Winnipeg Route 90) on the west; and by Inkster Boulevard (Route 23) on the south.

The ward falls within the community area of Seven Oaks and is served by the Seven Oaks School Division. Its population was 47,155 as of the 2016 census.

Geography 
Old Kildonan is the northernmost city ward in Winnipeg, stretching to the city's north perimeter.

Directly to its north is the Rural Municipality of West St. Paul, with the RM of East St. Paul to its northeast. To its east, it is bounded by the CP Winnipeg Beach railway (with a sliver reaching farther to Main Street) past McPhillips Street, sitting adjacent to the North Kildonan ward; to its west by Brookside Boulevard (Winnipeg Route 90); to its south/southwest by Inkster Boulevard (Route 23), adjacent to the Point Douglas ward; and to its southeast by the Mynarski ward.

The ward includes such neighbourhoods as Garden City, The Maples, Amber Trail, Leila-Mcphillips Triangle, Leila North, Templeton-Sinclair, North Inkster Industrial, West Kildonan Industrial, Rosser-Old Kildonan, and Mandalay West.

History 
Old Kildonan was originally part of the Rural Municipality of Kildonan in Manitoba, from 1914 until 1921.

The Parish of Kildonan was founded in 1812 by the Scottish philanthropist Thomas Douglas, 5th Earl of Selkirk, who named it Kildonan in 1817 for the Strath of Kildonan in Sutherlandshire, Scotland, from where many of the early settlers had come. There, in 1851, the first Presbyterian Church in western Canada was established.

The area was administered by the Council of Assiniboia until the creation of the Province of Manitoba in 1870. Following the signing of Treaty 1 with the Chippewa (Anishinabe) and Cree First Nations in 1871, settlement increased in the region and the process of municipal development had accelerated. In 1875, Kildonan became one of the districts of the Red River Colony, and originally rivalled Fort Garry in the Winnipeg area. In 1876, the community was incorporated as the Municipality of Kildonan and St. James, later becoming the Rural Municipality of Kildonan in 1880/1881.

From 1875 to 1914, Kildonan covered a large area on both sides of the Red River, just north of the original City of Winnipeg. In 1914, the Kildonan area was divided: the area east of the river became the RM of East Kildonan, and the area west of the river became the RM of West Kildonan. West Kildonan at that time included the area of current-day Old Kildonan. However, because West Kildonan had been developed as a residential suburb of Winnipeg, and wanted expensive urban services, while Old Kildonan remained primarily rural, and still had the rural farming character of the "Old" Parish of Kildonan, the two areas (along with North Kildonan) divided into separate municipalities on 1 July 1921. After the division of the area, the first elected reeve of Old Kildonan was Robert Toshack, with Councillor H. J. Seymour elected by acclamation in June 1921.

The area did not see substantial development until the late 1960s with the construction of The Maples subdivision, and even today contains substantial undeveloped areas and a number of farms.

Following the City of Winnipeg Act of 1972, Old Kildonan was amalgamated into the City of Winnipeg along with the other Kildonans and several other municipalities.

Past reeves 
Prior to its 1972 amalgamation, Old Kildonan was led by the following elected reeves:

Demographics and crime 

The ward falls within the community area of Seven Oaks and is served by the Seven Oaks School Division. Its population was 39,358 as of the 2011 census, growing to 47,155 as of the 2016 census.

In 2017, to help balance ward populations, Winnipeg's Wards Boundaries Commission moved two neighbourhoods from Old Kildonan to North Kildonan: Riverbend and Rivergrove.

In 2018, from the first of January to September 28, 364 crimes were reported from the area to police, compared to 303 during the same period the previous year—marking a 20% increase. In both periods, the most frequently reported crime was motor vehicle theft: 114 incidents in the 2018 period, compared to 82 from January to September 2017—a 39% increase.

See also
List of rural municipalities in Manitoba

References 

Seven Oaks, Winnipeg
Kildonan, Winnipeg
Former municipalities now in Winnipeg
Neighbourhoods in Winnipeg
Populated places disestablished in 1972
Wards in Winnipeg